Ghulam Ahmed  (4 July 1922 – 28 October 1998) was an off spin bowler who captained India in Test cricket. After his retirement, he served for many years as the secretary of BCCI.

Early life 
He was educated at the Madrassa-e-Aliya.

Cricket career 
He played first-class cricket for Hyderabad from 1939-40 to 1958-59, and 22 Tests for India from 1948-49 to 1958-59. He toured England in 1952 and Pakistan in 1954-55. He captained India in one Test against New Zealand in 1955-56, which was drawn, and two Tests against West Indies in 1958-59, both of which India lost.

He was the leading bowler on the 1952 tour, taking 80 wickets in first-class matches at 21.92, and 15 in the four Tests at 24.73. Wisden said he "had days when he looked in the highest world class, but on other occasions he lacked bite". In the first innings of the First Test he bowled 63 overs and took 5 for 100. In the match against Oxford University he took 8 for 84 and 5 for 66.

In the First Test against Pakistan in 1952-53, the inaugural Test between the two neighbours, he took five wickets, and made 50 at number 11, putting on 109 for the tenth wicket with Hemu Adhikari.

In the Third Test against Australia in Calcutta in 1956-57 he took 7 for 49 and 3 for 81, his best Test innings and match figures.

His best match and innings first-class figures came in the match against Madras in the Ranji Trophy in 1947-48, when he took 5 for 28 and 9 for 53. When Holkar made 757 against Hyderabad in 1950-51 he had bowling figures of 92.3-21-245-4.

He managed the Indian team that toured Australia and New Zealand in 1967-68.

Later years 
Ahmed was one of the founders of the Sultan-ul-Uloom Education Society.

Personal life and family 
He was the uncle of the former Pakistan captain Asif Iqbal, and the great-uncle of Indian tennis player Sania Mirza.

References

External links
 

India Test cricket captains
India Test cricketers
Indian cricketers
Indian cricket administrators
Hyderabad cricketers
Muslims cricketers
South Zone cricketers
Telugu people
1922 births
1998 deaths
Cricketers from Hyderabad, India